

Places

United States
 Kenedy, Texas, a city in Karnes County
 Kenedy County, Texas, a county
 Kenedy Independent School District, in Kenedy city, Texas
 Kenedy County Wide Common School District, in Kenedy County, Texas

People
Mifflin Kenedy (1818–1895), South Texas rancher and businessman and namesake of Kenedy County, Texas and Kenedy city, Texas
Kyla Kenedy (born 2003), U.S. actress

Soccer players
 Kenedy (footballer),  Robert Kenedy Nunes do Nascimento (born 1996), Brazilian soccer player
Kenedy Silva Reis, a.k.a. Keninha (born 1985), Brazilian soccer player
 Daniel Kenedy, a.k.a. Daniel Kenedy Pimentel Mateus dos Santos (born 1975), Portuguese soccer player

See also
 Kenidi family, a fictional family from North of 60, members such as Michelle Kenidi and Peter Kenidi
 Kennedy (disambiguation)